Time FM could mean any of the following radio stations operated by the Sunrise Radio Group:

 Time 106.6
 Time 106.8
 Time 107.3
 Time 107.5

British_radio_networks